James Ferguson may refer to:

Entertainment
 Jim Ferguson (born 1948), American jazz and classical guitarist
 Jim Ferguson, American guitarist, past member of Lotion
 Jim Ferguson, American movie critic, Board of Directors member for the Broadcast Film Critics Association
 Jimmy Ferguson (1940–1997), Irish-Canadian singer, member of The Irish Rovers

Politics
 James Ferguson, 1st Laird of Pitfour (1672–1734)
 James Ferguson, Lord Pitfour (1700–1777)
 James Ferguson (Scottish politician) (1735–1820), Scottish Tory politician
 James Burne Ferguson, New Zealand politician in 1850s
 James E. Ferguson (1871–1944), Governor of Texas
 James Ferguson (Australian politician) (1908–1975), South Australian House of Assembly
 James Ferguson (Canadian politician) (1925–2013), Canadian politician from Manitoba
 Jim Ferguson (public servant) (born 1940), Australian diplomat
 James Leo Ferguson, Bangladeshi politician

Science
 James Ferguson (Scottish astronomer) (1710–1776), Scottish astronomer and instrument maker
 James Ferguson (American astronomer) (1797–1867), American astronomer and engineer
 James Haig Ferguson (1862–1934), Scottish gynaecologist
 James Ferguson (anthropologist) (born 1959), American anthropologist

Sports
 James Ferguson (cricketer) (1848–1913), Australian cricketer
 Jim Ferguson (footballer) (1896–1952), Scottish professional football goalkeeper
 James Ferguson (footballer, fl. 1905–15), Scottish footballer
 James Ferguson (Queen's Park footballer), Scottish footballer
 James Ferguson (water polo) (born 1949), American water polo player
 Jimmy Ferguson (footballer) (born 1935), Scottish football goalkeeper

Other
 James Ferguson (minister) (1621–1667), Scottish minister
 James Ferguson (major-general) (died 1705), Scottish major-general
 James Frederic Ferguson (1807–1855), Irish antiquarian
 James Ferguson (general) (1913–2000), U.S. Air Force general
 James Ferguson (writer)  (?- present), English writer

See also
Ferguson (name)
James Fergusson (disambiguation)
James Ferguson Conant, American philosopher
James Ferguson Dowdell (1818–1871), U.S. representative from Alabama